The Hidden Lakes are a series of eight lakes in Gallatin County, Montana on the west slope of the Gallatin Range in south central Montana. The lakes are located at the head of Hidden Creek, a tributary of Portal Creek in the Gallatin National Forest.

References

Lakes of Montana
Bodies of water of Gallatin County, Montana